Kim Hill (born December 30, 1963) is a contemporary Christian music singer. Aside from her career as a Grammy Award-nominated and GMA Dove Award-winning solo artist, she has also sung background vocals on projects by other artists, such as Rich Mullins (Winds of Heaven, Stuff of Earth).

Personal life 
Hill was born in Starkville, Mississippi, and raised in Meridian, Mississippi. She attended Mississippi State, where she participated in volleyball and track and field. She moved to Nashville, Tennessee, where she signed her first record deal with Reunion Records. Hill was married to former Auburn University football player Rob Shuler. The marriage ended in divorce, but not before producing two sons: 3for3 band member Benji Shuler and former Stanford Cardinal football player Graham Shuler.

As of 2021, Hill is co-owner (with Paulette Wooten) of The Treehouse, a women's retreat property in North Carolina. She and Wooten formed the musical duo Wooten Hill and produced the EP Is It Alright in 2020.

Discography

Studio albums

Compilation albums

Live albums

Singles

Other charted songs

Music videos

References

External links
 Archived Official website

1963 births
Living people
American country singer-songwriters
American women country singers
American performers of Christian music
Christian music songwriters
Singer-songwriters from Mississippi
People from Starkville, Mississippi
Country musicians from Mississippi
21st-century American women singers
21st-century American singers